Lamborghini was a racing video game developed by Rage Software and published by Majesco Entertainment. It was cancelled in 2003 due to Rage Software's bankruptcy. The team that worked on Lamborghini went on and founded the game studio Juice Games, which created the Juiced series.
A playable demo of the game can be found in the March 2003 issue of the German Official Xbox Magazine. On May 14, 2022 a beta version was uploaded to Archive.org.

See also
Juice Games
Juiced series

References

Cancelled GameCube games
Cancelled Windows games
Cancelled PlayStation 2 games
Cancelled Xbox games
Juice Games
Lamborghini video games
Majesco Entertainment games
Rage Games games
Multiplayer and single-player video games